Jacob Banda (born 11 February 1988) is a Zambian international footballer who plays for ZESCO United, as a goalkeeper.

References

1988 births
Living people
Zambian footballers
Zambia international footballers
ZESCO United F.C. players
Association football goalkeepers
Zambia A' international footballers
2009 African Nations Championship players
2016 African Nations Championship players